Mutara may refer to:

 Mutara I of Rwanda, King of Rwanda, 1624–1648
 Mutara II Rwogera (1802 – 1853), King of Rwanda, 1830–1853
 Mutara III Rudahigwa (1912 – 1959), King of Rwanda, 1931–1959
 Mutara, a protected area in Rwanda
 Mutara Nebula, fictional nebula in Star Trek

See also
 Umutara, a former province of Rwanda